Johan Petrus Burger is a South African businessman and the CEO of FirstRand. He succeeded Sizwe Nxasana who retired after nine years as CEO. Burger was previously the company's CFO. He graduated from the University of Johannesburg.

References

South African businesspeople
University of Johannesburg alumni
Year of birth missing (living people)
Living people
Place of birth missing (living people)